In mathematics, gauge function may refer to
 the gauge as used in the definition of the Henstock-Kurzweil integral, also known as the gauge integral;
 in fractal geometry, a synonym for dimension function;
 in control theory and dynamical systems, a synonym for Lyapunov candidate function;
 in gauge theory, a synonym for gauge symmetry.
 a type of Minkowski functional